Ministry of Finance of Nauru is a ministry in Nauru responsible for overseeing and coordinating effective management of public finance and resources in Nauru. One of the divisions of the ministry is responsible for preparing annual budget. The ministry is lead by minister of finance appointed by President of Nauru. The current minister of finance is Martin Hunt.

Ministers of finance

See also
Government of Nauru
Economy of Nauru

References

Government of Nauru
Economy of Nauru
 
Nauru
1968 establishments in Nauru